Andrés Navarro Moreno (15 February 1938 – 18 August 2021) was a Spanish boxer. He competed in the men's welterweight event at the 1960 Summer Olympics.

References

External links
 

1938 births
2021 deaths
Spanish male boxers
Olympic boxers of Spain
Boxers at the 1960 Summer Olympics
Boxers from Barcelona
Welterweight boxers